Vitisin C is a hydroxystilbenoid. It is a resveratrol tetramer found in plants of the genus Vitis (grapevines).

References

External links 
 Website of the Schröder group

Resveratrol oligomers
Natural phenol tetramers
Grape